The 25th Bangladesh Infantry Regiment (25 BIR) is an Infantry Battalion of the Bangladesh Army. Presently this Battalion is operating under 19th Infantry Division of Bangladesh Army at Shahid Salahuddin Cantonment, Ghatail, Tangail. This is a Division Support Battalion. It is an adaptation of Mechanized Infantry battalion within the terrain of Bangladesh. There are total six Division Support Battalions in Bangladesh Army.

History

Background History 
The raising of a Division Support Battalion was long felt in the 19 Infantry Division. Finally it came into being on 21 November 1998 as the youngest Division Support battalion. It was first raised as the 69th East Bengal later to be transformed to the 25th Bangladesh Infantry Regiment, Uddipto Pachish.

Raising Members 
BA-4144 Captain Md. Humayun Kabir had joined the unit on 8 December 1998 as the first member of the unit. Thereafter BSS-1766 Lieutenant Colonel Saiful Islam Md Faruque Sheikh, as the first Commanding Officer, joined the unit on 31 January 1999. On 5 January 1999 BA- 2292 Major Md. Monirul Islam, psc joined the unit as the second-in-command. In the month of June 1999 2nd Lieutenant Emad Uddin Ahmed joined the unit as the first parent officer of the unit from the Bangladesh Military Academy. BJO-39845 Subedar Md. Akbor Hossain was the first JCO (Junior Commissioned Officer) of the unit who later on 1 October 1999 became the first SM (Master Warrant Officer) of the unit.

Transformation to BIR 
Initially the unit was raised on a 3-year plan to observe whether it can perform the bestowed responsibilities or not from 21 November 1998 to 20 November 2001. Finally on 8 November 1999 the official flag raising took place. The then Chief of Army Staff Lieutenant General Md. Mustafizur Rahman, BB, ndc, psc was present as the chief guest of the ceremony.

Official Flag Raising of BIR 
Though on 1 July 2001 the unit changed into BIR, the flag was raised on 30 March 2003. The then General Officer Commanding of 19 Infantry Division was the chief guest on that occasion. The raising day of the unit was 21 November which was later to be changed to 11 November by an order of the Army HQ.

UN Mission 
On 7 March 2007 the unit went for its UN mission as BANBAT- 12(UNMIL) to Liberia. After the successful completion of the assigned task it fell back on 4 March 2008.

Serving places 
The unit has so far served in two stations. It was first raised in the Mymensingh Cantonment where it rendered its service for almost 4 years and then later when the Division Headquarters was shifted to Shahid Salah Uddin Cantonment, Ghatail the unit was too brought here.

Regiments of Bangladesh